Childhood is an album by Sylvia Chang, released in 1981 in Taiwan by Rock Records and in 1982 in Hong Kong by Fontana Records. It is Chang and Lo Ta-yu's second collaboration and Lo's first album as a producer. Within three years at China Medical University (Taiwan) before his graduation in 1979, Lo wrote songs of this album. Some songs, including the titular song of the same name, have been later sung by other singers, like the album's songwriter Lo and the Taiwanese singer Su Rui.

Track listing 
Side one

All written and arranged by Lo Ta-yu, unless otherwise.
 "Everyone Comes Together" — 4:06
 "", "Running Water" or "Flowing Water", written by Lü Quansheng — 0:34
 An a cappella song
 "Childhood" — 3:35
 Later sung by Lo Ta-yu (in his 1983 album Zhi Hu Zhe Ye) and others
 "", "Scene of Winter" or "Bright Winter", composed by Xiong Tianyi, lyrics by Su Shi — 3:08
 Originally a poem from Song Dynasty (960–1279)
 "Little Angel", written by Xiong Tianyi — 2:56
 "Fallen Leaves" — 2:28

Side two

All written by Lo Ta-yu and arranged by Zheng Guichang
 "", "Whether or not" or "Will or will not" — 3:30
 Later sung by Su Rui with additional lyrics in her 1983 eponymous debut album
 "Four Seasons" — 2:20
 "Story of Time" — 2:53 
 Later sung by Lo Ta-yu in Zhi Hu Zhe Ye
 "Wishing to Be the Moon" — 3:32
 "", "Spring Wish" or "Toward Spring", arranged by Lo Ta-yu — 4:58

Reception 
Yao Hua praises Chang's performance of the titular song "Childhood" as [fresh and natural].

References 

Mandopop albums
1981 albums
Rock Records albums